Elections to Liverpool City Council were held on 1 November 1923.

One third of the council seats were up for election. The term of office for each councillor being three years.

Twelve of the thirty-nine seats up for election were uncontested.

After the election, the composition of the council was:

Election result

Ward results

* - Retiring Councillor seeking re-election

Comparisons are made with the 1920 election results, as the retiring councillors were elected in 1920.

Abercromby

Aigburth

Allerton

Anfield

Breckfield

Brunswick

Castle Street

Childwall

Dingle

Edge Hill

Everton

Exchange

Fairfield

Fazakerley

Garston

Granby

Great George

Kensington

Kirkdale

Low Hill

Much Woolton

Netherfield

North Scotland

Old Swan

Prince's Park

Sandhills

St. Anne's

St. Domingo

St. Peter's

Sefton Park East

Sefton Park West

South Scotland

Vauxhall

Walton

Warbreck

Wavertree

Wavertree West

West Derby

Aldermanic Elections

Aldermanic Election 9 November 1923

At the meeting of the Council on 9 November 1923, the terms of office of eighteen alderman expired.

The following eighteen were elected as Aldermen by the councillors on 9 November 1923 for a term of six years.

 - re-elected aldermen.

Aldermanic Election 4 June 1924

Caused by the death of Alderman William Henry Watts
(Liberal, last elected as an alderman on 9 November 1920)
on 13 March 1924
.

In his place Councillor James Bolger (Irish Nationalist), North Scotland, elected 1 November 1921) was elected as an alderman by the councillors on 4 June 1924
.

By-elections

No. 13 Princes Park, 22 November 1923
 
Caused by the resignation of Councillor David Jackson 
(Conservative, Prince's Park, elected 1 November 1922) which was reported to the Council on 9 November 1923

The term of office to expire on 1 November 1925.

No. 17 Aigburth, 17 January 1924

Caused by the death on 19 December 1923 of Councillor John Ritchie (Conservative, Aigburth, elected 1 November 1921)
.

No. 23 Netherfield, 9 April 1924

Caused by the election of Councillor Harold Edward Davies (Conservative, Netherfield, elected 1 November 1921) as an alderman by the councillors on 9 November 1923

No. 12 Dingle, 30 July 1924

Caused by the death of Councillor William Pemberton Coslett (Liberal, Dingle, elected 1 November 1921) on 16 October 1923 which was reported to the Council on 24 October 1923.

No. 2 North Scotland 10 July 1924

Caused by the election by the councillors of Councillor James Bolger (Irish Nationalist), North Scotland, elected 1 November 1921) as an alderman on 4 June 1924, following the death of Alderman William Henry Watts (Liberal, last elected as an alderman on 9 November 1920) on 13 March 1924.

See also

 Liverpool City Council
 Liverpool Town Council elections 1835 - 1879
 Liverpool City Council elections 1880–present
 Mayors and Lord Mayors of Liverpool 1207 to present
 History of local government in England

References

1923
1923 English local elections
1920s in Liverpool